Toetu "Tu" Nu'uali'itia (born 12 June 1971 in Auckland) is a New Zealand-born Samoan former rugby union player. He played as a scrum-half.

Biography
Born into a Samoan family, he is the youngest of five children. Starting to take up rugby in elementary school, throughout his career he played in the National Provincial Championship for Counties Manukau, North Harbour and Auckland (under the coaching of Graham Henry).

Career
He played in two Rugby World Cups for Western Samoa in the 1990s.  In 1991 he was part of the Samoa squad that memorably beat  Wales 16-13 at the Cardiff Arms Park in what is still one of the biggest upsets in international rugby. However, he did not play any match of the tournament. His first match for Western Samoa was in the test match against Tonga at Moamoa, on 4 June 1994. In the 1995 World Cup quarter-finals he scored a try at Ellis Park against the eventual winners, South Africa. His last match for Samoa was against the New Zealand at Napier, on 7 June 1996.

Following his retirement, he worked for the Auckland and Manukau Health Council and joined the private Oceania Career Academy, teaching management skills to Māori and Pacific Islander students. He collaborates with Sport Waitakere, Westforce Credit Union Operations Manager and is correspondent for 2K Plus International Sports Media and Radio Rhema.

Personal life
He professes Christianity and claims that it had a great influence on his life and career. He is married, has two sons and a daughter.

References

External links
 
 Interview with Tu Nu'uali'itia at Planet Sport
 Tu Nu'uali'tia at New Zealand Rugby History

1966 births
Living people
Rugby union players from Auckland
Samoan rugby union players
Samoan expatriate sportspeople in England
Rugby union scrum-halves
Samoa international rugby union players
West Hartlepool R.F.C. players
New Zealand expatriate sportspeople in England
New Zealand expatriate rugby union players
Samoan expatriate rugby union players
Expatriate rugby union players in England
New Zealand sportspeople of Samoan descent
Counties Manukau rugby union players
North Harbour rugby union players
Auckland rugby union players
New Zealand Christians